During the 2003–04 English football season, Queens Park Rangers competed in the Football League Second Division.

Season summary
After 3 seasons in English football's third tier, QPR secured a return to the second division with a second-placed finish.

Final league table

Football League Second Division

Results

Legend

Football League Second Division

FA Cup

League Cup

LDV Vans Trophy

Players

First-team squad
Squad at end of season

Left club during season

References

Notes

Queens Park Rangers F.C. seasons
Queens Park Rangers